Impetigo was an American death metal band. They were among the first bands to use clips from films and other media as intros for their songs.

Overview 
Their lyrical themes mostly include 1970s and '80s splatter films, cannibal films and gore.

In 2010 they released a DVD entitled Defiling the Stage which includes four live acts, one in 1987, two in 1990 and one reunion show from 2007.

In 2003, Razorback Records released Wizards of Gore, an Impetigo tribute album, featuring Blood Duster, Mortician, Machetazo, Impaled, Haemorrhage, Exhumed, Cock and Ball Torture, Lymphatic Phlegm, Last Days of Humanity, Gore Beyond Necropsy, Lord Gore, and more. Razorback Records has also released the "ultimate" reissues of the Ultimo Mondo Cannibale and Horror of the Zombies albums, which include the original artwork, liner notes by bassist/vocalist Stevo Dobbins, and bonus tracks.

Band members 
 Stevo Dobbins – vocals, bass
 Mark Sawickis – guitar
 Dan Malin – drums
 Scotty Bross – guitar

Original discography 
 All We Need Is Cheez (1987, live demo)
 Giallo (1989, demo)
 Ultimo Mondo Cannibale (1990)
 Antefatto (1991, split 7-inch EP with Blood)
 Buio Omega (1991, 7-inch EP)
 Faceless (1991, 7-inch EP)
 Horror of the Zombies (1992)
 Primitives (1999, split 7-inch EP with Transgressor)
 Late Night Necrophiliac Fun (1999, split mCD with Ingrowing)
 Live Total Zombie Gore Holocaust (2008, Live)
 Defiling The Stage (2010, DVD)

Re-releases 
 Giallo (1999, 10-inch picture disc)
 All We Need Is Cheez (1999)
 Ultimo Mondo Cannibale (1999, 12-inch picture disc)
 Faceless (2000, mCD/7" EP)
 Buio Omega (2000, mCD/CD-ROM)
 Giallo/Antefatto (2000)
 Horror of the Zombies (2001, picture disc LP)
 Ultimo Mondo Cannibale "Ultimate Edition" (2006)
 Horror of the Zombies "Ultimate Edition" (2007)

External links 
Official Impetigo website (archived)
[ Impetigo] at AllMusic
Razorback Records

American death metal musical groups
American grindcore musical groups
Hardcore punk groups from Illinois
Musical quartets
Goregrind musical groups
Heavy metal musical groups from Illinois
Musical groups established in 1987